Sympycnodes arachnophora is a species of moth of the family Cossidae. It is found in Australia, where it is only found in inland south-eastern Australia. The habitat consists of dry woodland.

The wingspan is 35–41 mm for males and 44 mm for females. The forewings are cream to light brown, with reddish to dark brown markings. Adults have been recorded on wing from December to March.

References

Moths described in 1945
Zeuzerinae